Drewry may refer to:

People
 Drewry (surname)

Places
 Drewry's Bluff
 Drewry Point Provincial Park
 Drewry, North Carolina, a community located on the border of Vance County, North Carolina, and Warren County, North Carolina

Companies
 Drewry's Beer
 Drewry Car Co.
 Shelvoke and Drewry

Other
 CSS Drewry